Melencio Santos Sta. Maria Jr. (born February 23, 1957) is a Filipino lawyer, law professor, and television & radio presenter. He has been the dean of Far Eastern University's law school since 2013. He has also been teaching at his alma mater, the Ateneo School of Law, since 1986.

In television and radio, he is affiliated with TV5, notably as a  legal correspondent for Relasyon and Solved na Solved.

Education and career
He graduated in BS Biology from Ateneo de Manila University in 1978, and four years later he obtained his Bachelor of Laws with Honors at the same school same as classmate Ray Espinosa (current director at MVP group and 1982 bar topnotcher). After joining the Philippine Bar he became partner at the Tanjuatco Sta. Maria Tanjuatco Law Firm. He obtained his Master of Law in Banking in Boston University in 1986. Also in that year, he started to teach at the Ateneo Law School, as the professor in Persons and Family Relations Law, Obligations and Contracts, as well as the Civil Law Review and a reviewer for Civil law. Atty Mel, as he is fondly called, is also a lecturer for Philippine Judicial Academy. In 2013, he was appointed Dean of Far Eastern University Institute of Law replacing Atty. Andres D. Bautista.

On July 6, 2020, Sta. Maria and six other law professors from FEU filed a petition to the Supreme Court to issue a temporary restraining order (TRO) against several provisions of the Anti-Terrorism Act of 2020, which was signed by President Rodrigo Duterte on July 3. The said provisions include the law's definition of terrorism, the acts it considers as "terrorism", the process by which individuals and groups are labelled and officially declared as terrorists, and the warrantless detention of suspected terrorists. Sta. Maria's group aims to have the aforementioned provisions declared unconstitutional and void.

Broadcast career
He joined News5 in 2010 as a legal adviser, he also joins Relasyon along with News5 head Luchi Cruz-Valdes on DWFM and AksyonTV, in 2015 he joins the new legal advice show Solved na Solved with Gelli de Belen (she also spoofed Cruz-Valdes on Tropa Mo Ko Unli on Walang Relasyon parody) and Arnell Ignacio on TV5.

In August 2014, Sta. Maria interviewed President Benigno Aquino III in Malacañan Palace, about his possible re-election in 2016 despite a constitutional ban (on re-election). Expressing a bit of constitutional reform, Sta Maria's interview with Aquino was praised by netizens.

Books authored
 Read My Mind (2013)
 What's the Point (2015)
 Persons and Family Relations Law  (Rex Publishing, 1995)

Other
 FHM Philippines XV Special, FHM Heroes article (March 2015)

Personal life
Mel is the eldest son of Melencio Sta. Maria, a medical doctor, and Florencia Santos, and the younger brother to Melita Sta. Maria-Thomeczek, current Philippine Ambassador to Germany in Berlin. He is married to Amparita de los Santos, also a lawyer and ALS classmate with whom he has 3 children.

References

1957 births
Living people
Filipino radio journalists
Filipino television journalists
20th-century Filipino lawyers
Ateneo de Manila University alumni
Academic staff of Ateneo de Manila University
Boston University alumni
News5 people
21st-century Filipino lawyers